Promenades Cathédrale is a  retail complex on Saint Catherine Street in downtown Montreal, Quebec, Canada.

The complex is located beneath Montreal's Anglican Christ Church Cathedral. Constructed in 1987-88, the mall is integrated into the underground city.

The complex is connected to Henry Morgan Building across the street along Avenue Union and home to Hudson's Bay Company Montreal store.

See also

List of malls in Montreal
Place de la Cathédrale office tower

References

External links

 

Shopping malls in Montreal
Shopping malls established in 1987
Downtown Montreal